The Swift 016.a is an open-wheel formula racing car, designed, developed and manufactured by American company Swift Engineering, for the Formula Atlantic spec-series, and has been the sole car used in the series since 2006. They are powered by naturally aspirated  Mazda four-cylinder MZR engines, which has been specially tuned by Cosworth, to produce . This drives the rear wheels through a 5-speed sequential manual transmission.

References

Swift Engineering vehicles
Formula Atlantic